Ginette Bedard (born December 12, 1933) is a French-American long-distance runner from Queens, New York. She is known for her participation in marathons since 2001, at the age of sixty-seven. In 2005, she set the U.S. marathon record for women aged 70–74. In 2008, at age seventy-four, she set the masters W75 marathon world record with a time of 4:08:31. , she has participated in seventeen New York City Marathons, where she at times has been the oldest woman to participate.

She attributes her fitness despite her age to the practice of running ten miles a day along Howard Beach where she resides.

Background 
Bedard was born in Metz, France. She married a member of the Canadian Air Force and moved to Canada, then later to New York, where she became an American citizen. When interviewed by the New Yorker in 2019, she said she first became interested in physical fitness after watching the Jack LaLanne Show on a regular basis:

Running career 
Bedard participated in her first New York City marathon in 2002, and according to the New York Road Runners  ran in over 350 races, including 44 half-marathons and 20 marathons.

Notable marathoning achievements

References 

1933 births
Living people
Sportspeople from Metz
Sportspeople from Queens, New York
French female long-distance runners
Track and field athletes from New York City
American female long-distance runners
French female marathon runners
American female marathon runners
World record holders in masters athletics
21st-century American women